Mehmet Gürkan Öztürk (born 26 March 1989) is a Turkish professional footballer who plays for TFF Second League club Amed.

References

External links

1989 births
People from Ayancık
Living people
Turkish footballers
Turkey youth international footballers
Association football forwards
İstanbulspor footballers
Gümüşhanespor footballers
Darıca Gençlerbirliği footballers
Aydınspor footballers
Çaykur Rizespor footballers
Yeni Malatyaspor footballers
Kartalspor footballers
Niğde Anadolu FK footballers
Bandırmaspor footballers
Zonguldakspor footballers
Utaş Uşakspor footballers
Ankaraspor footballers
Süper Lig players
TFF Second League players
TFF Third League players